Jose Carlos Moreira (born July 3, 1961 in Rio de Janeiro, Brazil) is a Brazilian Jiu-Jitsu practitioner and a former mixed martial artist.

Biography

Early life and career
Joe was born inside a taxicab in front of a Rio de Janeiro hospital. His dark skin and blond hair prompted the affectionate nickname of "Macaco." By age five, Moreira's older brother, Marcos, influenced the youngster to start fighting in Judo. His first title for the Gama Filho University team was won by age six. Around that time he began his Brazilian Jiu-Jitsu career under the tutelage of Mauricio LaCerda.

At age nine, he began training in Jiu-Jitsu at the schools of the Carlson and Rolls Gracie, where he was taught mainly by Reyson Gracie and Pinduka. Across the street there was another studio owned and operated by Reylson Gracie, another son of the legendary Carlos Gracie. A chance visit to the studio resulted in Moreira spending the next 15 years under the tutelage of Reylson, who took a liking to the young fighter's style and groomed him to become an instructor. During this period with Master Reylson, Moreira also learned to produce tournaments and championships. This would later help him to organize one of the most important Jiu-Jitsu tournaments in Brazil, including the first international Brazilian Jiu-Jitsu event, Atlantico Sul.

Another respected Jiu-Jitsu master, Francisco Mansour, awarded Moreira his black belt in 1984. By competing in the most important Jiu-Jitsu tournaments of the 1980s, such as Copa Company, Copa Lightning Bolts and Copa Cantao, Moreira's collection of titles grew. His participation in such events garnered Moreira's respect and recognition as one of the toughest fighters of his time.

Around that time, the Gracie family was always looking for tough opponents to take on the undefeated Rickson Gracie. It wasn't long before Moreira accepted the challenge to face his idol twice in the same competition (weight - category final and absolute) despite not having good partners with whom to train. Although he was submitted in both matches, Moreira gave the Jiu-Jitsu legend something he was not used to: a tough fight. Following these bouts, a great friendship evolved between the two fighters.

By 1986, Moreira was a black belt in both Judo and Brazilian Jiu-Jitsu. The next step in his evolution came in the form of internships at Tenri University, in Japan, and at the Kodokan, the traditional Judo academy established by Judo founder Jigoro Kano. After four months of training with the Japanese Olympic team and completing a course with more than 1,000 black belt students, Moreira became vice champ in an international tournament: the Judo World Cup.

After a year of invaluable training in Japan, Moreira returned to his Brazilian academy in Rio de Janeiro and produced his first tournament: the Atlantico Sul Cup, which saw the debut of world names such as Ryan Gracie, Renzo Gracie, and Ralph Gracie, SHOOTO welterweight champion Vítor Ribeiro, UFC veteran Jorge Patino, Nino Schembri and Marcio Feitosa, Cleber Luciano, Wander Braga, Wallid Ismail, Jean Jacques Machado, Fabio Gurgel, Murilo Bustamante, Mario Sperry, Allan Goes, Ricardo de la Riva Goded, and others who helped to establish it as a premier tournament. Nine Atlantico Sul Cup events were held between 1986 and 1994, produced with the help of his partners and friends, Claudio Franca and Marcus Viniclus.

In the early 1990s, an invitation from Reylson Gracie prompted Moreira to sell all of his possessions in Brazil and travel to the United States to be a Brazilian Jiu-Jitsu instructor. "He promised me everything," Moreira remembers, "but when I got there, it was pretty different." Because of some financial disagreements, he decided to go it alone and forge his own path.

After two difficult months in the United States - and despite not speaking a word of English - Moreira teamed up with entrepreneur Cab Garrett to build his own gym, "Joe Moreira Jiu-Jitsu de Brazil", in Irvine, California. 

Moreira also founded the diploma mill United States Federation of Brazilian Jiu-Jitsu and played a major role in the dissemination of the art in America. As president of the federation, he created the first international Brazilian Jiu-Jitsu tournament, the Joe Moreira Cup, and organized the first edition of the Pan-American Jiu-Jitsu tournament with Carlos Gracie, Jr., president of the Brazilian Jiu-Jitsu Confederation. Those events launched the first top representatives of Brazilian Jiu-Jitsu in America - names like BJ Penn, Garth Taylor, Egan Inoue, Mark Kompayneyets, Chris Brennan, Eddie Bravo, Javier Vazquez, Ricco Rodriguez, and many others that later transformed the United States into the second Jiu-Jitsu power of the world.

Mixed martial arts
Even while being involved with his U.S. Jiu-Jitsu organization, Moreira continued competing. Following his long string of Jiu-Jitsu and Judo victories, he decided to test his skills in mixed martial arts competition via the Ultimate Fighting Championship. On February 16, 1996, Moreira fought the six-foot-eight-inch, 360-pound Paul Varelans in the UFC 8 and lost by a narrow decision. He competed again the following year at UFC 14, winning his first match against Yuri Vaulin by unanimous decision, putting him in the finals of the Middleweight bracket. After his bout however, the on-site doctor concluded Moreira showed signs of a concussion, and did not clear him to fight, leading to Moreira being replaced by an alternate.

Vale Tudo Training
Following the appearance in the UFC, Moreira encountered his first controversy with the Brazilian Jiu-Jitsu world. At a time when there was an unwritten rule that black belts were prohibited from teaching Jiu-Jitsu techniques to non-Brazilian vale tudo fighters, Moreira started to teach his good friend, Kimo Leopoldo. The Brazilian Jiu-Jitsu community was shocked by his breach of protocol and labeled Moreira a traitor.

Eighteen months later, following his first MMA victory over Uri Vaulin at the UFC 14, Moreira shocked the Brazilian Jiu-Jitsu community again by revealing that he trained with Marco Ruas to fight the Russian boxer - without the help of the Gracie family or anyone else from the Brazilian Jiu-Jitsu community. Seeing the good ground technique presented by Ruas, who trained in Jiu-Jitsu for 15 years, Moreira gave him a Brazilian Jiu-Jitsu black belt and caused a commotion among his fellow Brazilians. These two important decisions helped pave the way for his cross training to take its now-prominent role in fight training.

Lineage
Kano Jigoro → Tomita Tsunejiro → Mitsuyo Maeda → Carlos Gracie → Helio Gracie → Francisco Mansor → Joe Moreira

Mixed martial arts record

|-
|Loss
|align=center|2-2
|Paul Herrera
|Decision
|Hitman Fighting Productions 2
|
|align=center|3
|align=center|5:00
|Santa Ana, California, United States
|
|-
|Win
|align=center|2-1
|Joe Son
|Submission (terror)
|Xtreme Pankration 2
|
|align=center|1
|align=center|N/A
|Los Angeles, California, United States
|
|-
|Win
|align=center|1-1
|Yuri Vaulin
|Decision (unanimous)
|UFC 14
|
|align=center|1
|align=center|15:00
|Birmingham, Alabama, United States
|
|-
|Loss
|align=center|0-1
|Paul Varelans
|Decision (unanimous) 
|UFC 8
|
|align=center|1
|align=center|10:00
|San Juan, Puerto Rico
|

See also
List of Brazilian Jiu-Jitsu practitioners

References

External links
 Site Oficial: https://joemoreira.com
 
 

Living people
Brazilian male mixed martial artists
Mixed martial artists utilizing Luta Livre
Mixed martial artists utilizing judo
Mixed martial artists utilizing vale tudo
Mixed martial artists utilizing Brazilian jiu-jitsu
Brazilian practitioners of Brazilian jiu-jitsu
People awarded a coral belt in Brazilian jiu-jitsu
Brazilian male judoka
Sportspeople from Rio de Janeiro (city)
1961 births
Ultimate Fighting Championship male fighters